Issikiopteryx aurolaxa is a moth in the family Lecithoceridae. It is found in China (Sichuan).

References

Moths described in 1993
Issikiopteryx
Moths of Asia